Dasht-e Emam may refer to:
 Dasht-e Emam, Hormozgan
 Dasht-e Emam, Sistan and Baluchestan